Vlad Sokolovsky (real name- Vsevolod Andreyevich Sokolovsky, born 24 September 1991, Moscow) is a Russian singer, songwriter, producer, dancer, and TV host. In the past, he performed as a dancer in Todes ballet and as a singer in the duo BiS. He is currently a solo singer working in R&B/euro-pop eclectic style.

Biography
Sokolovsky was born on 24 September 1991 into an artistic family. His father, Andrey Aleksandrovich Sokolovski, was a choreographer, founder, and soloist of the vocal-and-dance group "X-Mission". His mother, Irina Vsevolodovna (née) Serbina-Herz, was a circus performer who did tightrope dancing and stage director. He has a sister, Daria Serbina. In June 2015 Vlad married Margarita Gerasimovich, performing under the stage name Rita Dakota. In October 2017 their daughter Mia was born. They divorced in August 2018.

Early music career
He started performing at the age of 3 in a video clip with Filip Kirkorov "Zayka moya" (My Bunny). In 1996 he started studying dance at the Art School and continued at studio Todes. In 2001 he recorded his first big hit "Red-haired Up". In 2002 and 2004 he performed in the music and circus show Peter Pan based on the J. M. Barrie story. In 2004 he plays in the musical "Holiday of Disobedience" based on S. Mikhalkov's story. During this whole time he also occasionally performed with a band X-Mission as a singer. In 2006, after the departure of a singer, Vlad joined X-Mission as a full-time singer.
Sokolovskiy and fellow BiS singer Dmitriy Bikbaev participated in the seventh season of Fabrika Zvyozd and came in third place.

References
 
 http://x-mission2005.narod.ru/sokol.html
http://www.kino-teatr.ru/kino/acter/w/ros/6849/bio/
 Влад Соколовский: После свадьбы девули подписались на меня!. НСН (24 сентября 2016).

 https://www.beatport.com/artist/vlad-sokolovskiy/689106

1991 births
Living people
Russian pop singers
Russian male dancers
Russian producers
Fabrika Zvyozd
21st-century Russian singers
21st-century Russian male singers